"Nostan kytkintä" is a song by Finnish rapper Cheek. Released in 2005, the song serves as the second single from Cheek's second studio album Käännän sivuu. "Nostan kytkintä" peaked at number 13 on the Finnish Singles Chart.

Chart performance

References

Finnish songs
2005 songs
2005 singles
Cheek (rapper) songs